Qiqi may refer to:
Rong Qiqi
Yuan Qiqi
Qi Qi (host), a Singaporean television host and radio deejay
Qiqi (tilting vessel), an ancient Chinese ceremonial utensil
Qiqi, a character in Genshin Impact